The 1882 United States elections occurred in the middle of Republican President Chester A. Arthur's term, during the Third Party System. Arthur had become president on September 19, 1881, upon the death of his predecessor, James Garfield. Members of the 48th United States Congress were chosen in this election. Democrats won control of the House, while Republicans won control of the Senate.

Following the 1880 census, the size of the House increased by 32 seats. Democrats won major gains, taking control of the chamber.

In the Senate, Republicans picked up one seat, giving them half of the seats in the chamber. Senate Republicans held a majority in a coalition with the Readjuster Party.

See also
1882 United States House of Representatives elections
1882–83 United States Senate elections

References

1882 elections in the United States
1882
United States midterm elections